Niall Buggy (born 3 October 1948) is an Irish actor who has worked extensively on stage and screen in Ireland, the United Kingdom and United States. Buggy is the recipient of several drama awards, including an Obie Award, Drama Desk Award, and Clarence Derwent Award. Some of his better known roles include the lead in Brian Friel's Uncle Vanya, for which he won an Irish Times Theatre Award, and Brian in Dead Funny for which he won an Olivier Award.

Biography

Early life
Buggy was born on 3 October 1948 in Dublin. His parents attended the Theatre Royal every Friday night. At the age of 11, he ran away from home and travelled to the theatre, saying he was there for an audition. There were no auditions that day and he was told to return the following day. Buggy went home, intending to return the following day, but instead found a search party outside around his Drumcondra home.

At the age of 16, Buggy was enrolled at Dublin's Abbey Theatre School.

Theatre
In 1995, Buggy won the Laurence Olivier Award for Best Comedy Performance for Dead Funny. In 2010, he starred alongside Brenda Blethyn in Edna O'Brien's play Haunted. The 6 date spring tour concluded with a run on the West End.   In Brian Friel’s Aristocrats, he won TimeOut, Clarence Derwent, Drama Desk and Obie awards. More recent plays include Penelope by Enda Walsh, Krapp's Last Tape at the Leeds Playhouse, Beckett Trilogy and On Blueberry Hill by Sebastian Barry for which he won the Origin theatre award in New York.

Filmography

Film

Television

Podcast

References

External links
 

1948 births
Living people
People from Dublin (city)
Irish male film actors
Irish male stage actors
Laurence Olivier Award winners
Obie Award recipients
Drama Desk Award winners
Clarence Derwent Award winners